Darkness  is a 2015 Serbian drama film directed by Jug Radivojević. It was named as one of five films that could be chosen as the Serbian submission for the Best Foreign Language Film at the 89th Academy Awards, but it was not selected.

Cast
 Tamara Dragicevic as Aska
 Viktor Savic as Vuk
 Vuk Kostic as Obrad
 Vladislava Milosavljevic as Zivana

References

External links
 

2015 films
2015 drama films
Serbian drama films
2010s Serbian-language films
Films shot in Belgrade
Films set in Belgrade